Roselyn Ngissah is a Ghanaian actress. She started acting at an early age, and has featured in movies including Adams Apple, Away Bus, and Princess Tyra.

Early life and education 
Roselyn, born to Ghanaian parents, grew up in Lagos, Nigeria where she had her basic education. She graduated at the University of Ghana, Legon with a second class upper degree in Theatre Art in 2008.

Roselyn earned her first film role in Sicily, 2003. While playing small parts in several movies, she nabbed her breakthrough role as Angie in 4Play and 4Play Reloaded in 2010 and 2011 respectively.

Filmography
Adams Apples
Princess Tyra
Power of The Gods
Last Victory
My Sister's Honour 
4 Play
Broken Mirror
John and John
Somewhere in Africa
Away Bus
Amakye and Dede
Trending Crimes (2020)
Pauline's Diary (2017)
Sin of the soul
Aloe Vera
40 Looks Good on You
The Miser

Achievements

References

External links 
 

Living people
21st-century Ghanaian actresses
University of Ghana alumni
Year of birth missing (living people)